Tong Tanjun (15 August 1934 – 25 December 2022) was a Chinese Biochemist and Molecular Biologist, and an academician of the Chinese Academy of Sciences, as well as an academician of the Chinese Academy of Medical Sciences.

Biography
Tong was born in Cixi County (now Ci'xi), Zhejiang, on 15 August 1934. His father was an accountant and his mother is a housewife.  He attended Shanghai Qingxin Primary School, Shanghai Yucai Middle School and Shanghai Guangshi High School. After high school, he studied, then taught, at what is now Peking University Health Science Center, where he successively worked as lecturer (1978), associate professor (1985), and professor (1988).

In 1978, Tong was among a group of 52 Chinese scholars selected by China's Ministry of Education in broad scientific and technological disciplines in the country, to study abroad in the United States. He arrived in the US in the eve of historical visit by Chinese President Deng Xiao Ping and normalization of the Sino-US relationship in 1979. Tong became the first visiting scholar from mainland China at the National Institutes of Health and Johns Hopkins University. He returned to China in 1981 and continued to teach at the Peking University Health Science Centre. In 1986, he became a visiting scholar at the University of California, Davis and New York University, and returned to China in 1988. He joined the Jiusan Society in 1988 and was an active member.  He conducted cancer research in his early career, but consolidated his interests later to focus on ageing related research in anticipation of a growing ageing population in China. He founded Peking University Research Center on Aging in 2004 and was the founding Director of the Center ever since. He was elected to the Chinese Academy of Sciences in 2005, and Chinese Academy of Medical Sciences in 2019, on numerous editorial boards of professional journals.    

After suffering a fall, Tong died in Beijing on 25 December 2022, at the age of 88.

Honours and awards
 2005 Member of the Chinese Academy of Sciences (CAS)
 2019 Member of the Chinese Academy of Medical Sciences

References

1934 births
2022 deaths
Chinese molecular biologists
Johns Hopkins University alumni
Academic staff of Peking University
People from Cixi
Engineers from Zhejiang
Members of the Chinese Academy of Sciences